Mike Lenzly (born 1 May 1981) is a British former professional basketball player. At a height of 1.89 m (6'2 ") tall, he played at the point guard and shooting guard positions.

College career
Lenzly attended Wofford College in Spartanburg, South Carolina. He played four seasons for the Terriers, before graduating in 2003. He was selected to the Wofford College Athletics Hall of Fame.

Professional career
Lenzly played professional basketball for several European clubs. In 2005 Lenzly won the Latvian League championship with Ventspils. Lenzly was a part of the Dexia Mons-Hainaut team that made the final of the FIBA EuroChallenge's 2007–08 season. With ČEZ Nymburk, Lenzly won the Czech League and Czech Cup, in 2010, 2011, and 2012.

National team career
Lenzly was a member of the senior Great Britain national basketball team.  He played with the team at the EuroBasket 2009, and averaged 6.0 points, 1.7 rebounds and 1.0 assists per game, during the tournament. His most impressive performance was 14 points scored in the team's first-round near upset of Spain. Lenzly also played at the EuroBasket 2011, and the 2012 London Summer Olympics.

References

External links
FIBA Profile
EuroCup Profile
Eurobasket.com Profile

1981 births
Living people
APOEL B.C. players
Basketball players at the 2012 Summer Olympics
Belfius Mons-Hainaut players
BK Ventspils players
British expatriate basketball people in Spain
British expatriate basketball people in the United States
British men's basketball players
Basketball Nymburk players
English expatriates in Germany
Olympic basketball players of Great Britain
People from Hampton, Georgia
Point guards
Shooting guards
Scafati Basket players
S.Oliver Würzburg players
Tenerife CB players
Wofford Terriers men's basketball players